is a traditional Venezuelan and Colombian sport, very similar to a rodeo, where a small group of llaneros (cowboys) on horseback pursue cattle at high speeds through a narrow pathway (called a ) in order to drop or tumble them.

 are usually presented as a side attraction to a larger event, such as a religious festival. They are very popular in Venezuela and in parts of Colombia, mostly in the plains (llanos).

A  starts with the participants and a calf or bull (this depends on the age and stature of the competitors) locked behind a trap door. When a judge gives a signal, the calf is set loose and starts running. A couple of seconds later, the riders are released and they race to grab the calf by its tail. The rider who accomplishes this first will increase speed, dragging the calf until it finally stumbles. The object is to accomplish this in the shortest time.

 can be a dangerous sport, and most of the participants are male. However  in which all the contestants are female are not uncommon. Accidents can happen, because the riders compete aggressively and ride at high speed with minimal bodily protection. Additionally, some spectators attend  sitting on top of the high guard rails, and the occasional excited or drunken spectator may fall or collide with the riders or the bull itself.

References
Romero, Simon. "Venezuela’s Passion: Twisting the Tail of an Angry Beast". The New York Times. 2006-09-10

Equestrian sports
Sport in Venezuela
Equestrian sports in Venezuela 
Equestrian sports in Colombia
Sport in Colombia
Working stock horse sports